Ankasakasa Tsibiray is a rural municipality in western Madagascar. It belongs to the district of Besalampy, which is a part of Melaky Region.

In 2019 the Cyclone Belna damaged the municipality by 90%

References 

Populated places in Melaky